Frits van Dongen (born 12 March 1946, in 's-Hertogenbosch) is an architect from the Netherlands. He designed a canal-side municipal theatre for the city of Leeuwarden with his firm De Architecten Cie. The building he designed that is known as The Whale is in an area known as the Oostelijke Handelskade (Eastern Docklands area) that includes "some of The Netherlands' most cutting-edge housing developments including Piraeus, designed by Hans Kollhoff and Christian Rappit, "Hoop, Liefde en Fortuin" (named after three windmills that used to dominate this area) by Rudy Uytenhaak" and one of Jamie Oliver's "Fifteen" restaurants. R otterdam Maaskant Prize for Young Architects 2005 winner Oliver Thill and his architecture partner André Kempe, both from East Germany, both worked in van Dongen's office.

Projects 
Delfts Blauw, Delft, The Netherlands, 1998
Batavia - Entrepot - West 4, Amsterdam, The Netherlands, 2000
The Whale, Amsterdam, The Netherlands, 2000

Selected publications 
 Frits van Dongen, Ron van der Ende, Braden King. The factory set, Frame Publishers, 2015.

See also
List of Dutch architects

References

1946 births
Living people
Dutch architects
People from 's-Hertogenbosch
Delft University of Technology alumni